Zitenga  is a department or commune of Oubritenga Province in northern-central Burkina Faso. Its capital lies at the town of Zitenga. According to the 1996 census the department has a total population of 40,773.

Towns and villages
 Zitenga	(644 inhabitants) (capital)
 Andem	(1 798 inhabitants)
 Bagtenga	(913 inhabitants)
 Barkoundouba-Mossi	(716 inhabitants)
 Bendogo	(644 inhabitants)
 Bissiga-Mossi	(597 inhabitants)
 Bissiga- Yarcé	(1 700 inhabitants)
 Boalla	(494 inhabitants)
 Dayagretenga	(981 inhabitants)
 Dimianema	(1 056 inhabitants)
 Itaoré	(504 inhabitants)
 Kogmasgo	(448 inhabitants)
 Kolgdiessé	(410 inhabitants)
 kologkom	(422 inhabitants)
 Komnogo	(176 inhabitants)
 Lallé 	(1 015 inhabitants)
 Leléxé	(1 280 inhabitants)
 Lemnogo	(1 409 inhabitants)
 Nagtaoli	(281 inhabitants)
 Nambéguian	(704 inhabitants)
 Nioniokodogo Mossi	(375 inhabitants)
 Nioniokodogo peulh	(1 122 inhabitants)
 Nioniopalogo	(669 inhabitants)
 Nonghin	(1 237 inhabitants)
 Ouatinoma	(964 inhabitants)
 Pedemtenga	(1 316 inhabitants)
 Poédogo	(419 inhabitants)
 Sadaba	(3 788 inhabitants)
 Samtenga	(401 inhabitants)
 Souka	(528 inhabitants)
 Tamasgo	(1 127 inhabitants)
 Tampanga	(312 inhabitants)
 Tampelga	(1 084 inhabitants)
 Tampouy-Silmimossé	(124 inhabitants)
 Tampouy-Yarcé	(1 203 inhabitants)
 Tanghin	(989 inhabitants)
 Tanghin Kossodo peulh	(336 inhabitants)
 Tankounga	(2 009 inhabitants)
 Tanlili	(1 696 inhabitants)
 Tiba	(477 inhabitants)
 Toanda	(1 039 inhabitants)
 Yamana	(1 222 inhabitants)
 Yanga	(354 inhabitants)
 Yargo	(871 inhabitants)
 Zakin	(573 inhabitants)
 Zéguédéguin	(346 inhabitants)

References

Departments of Burkina Faso
Oubritenga Province